Saguni is a 2012 Indian Tamil-language political comedy film directed by Shankar Dayal and produced by S. R. Prabhu. The film stars Karthi and Pranitha, while Santhanam, Prakash Raj, Kiran Rathod, Kota Srinivasa Rao, Raadhika Sarathkumar and Nassar appear in supporting roles. Dubbed versions of the film were released in Telugu and Hindi as Shakuni (2012) and Rowdy Leader (2016) respectively. The film was declared an average hit.

Plot
The film starts with the IRP party's MLA meeting to select their new CM, where prominent leader and veteran Satyamoorthy is unanimously chosen as CM. He is then escorted to his car, where a party cadre accuses him of sexually harassing her by passing on a promiscuous video in a mobile phone. This leads to Satyamoorthy being heavily shunned by the public and causes the suicide of Satyamoorthy and his entire family. This entire sequence is a political plot planned by the same party's influential minister R. K. Boopathi. Two days earlier, Boopathi had asked Satyamoorthy to leave way for him as he has been waiting twenty years to directly become Chief Minister. Boopathi creates a scene at the funeral and then goes on to win MLA by-election in Satyamoorthy's constituency Karaikudi and becomes the Chief Minister of Tamil Nadu.

Meanwhile, Kamalakannan is forcibly taken as passenger by auto driver Rajini Appadurai  near Chennai International Airport, seeing Kamal's rich clothing. Rajini assumes that Kamal is rich and drives him around the city to be profited from him. Kamal is actually a farmer and also runs a free-meal service in his village near Karaikudi. He has come to the capital city to meet concerned politicians and plead them to halt a Railways project, by which he could lose his only ancestral property in his village. He is the grandson of a humble person who serves unlimited food to the guests and passersby every day.

Kamal stays in his paternal aunt Dr. Rani's house, and love blossoms between him and her daughter Sridevi. Their love affair is ended when Kamal promises to forever leave Sridevi on Rani's demand, when Sridevi goes on a foreign tour. Kamal meets Boopathi, who once visited their village during the by-election campaign and had promised to do good deeds when required. Kamal learns that Boopathi is the one behind the project for his mistress, whom he had used to kill Satyamoorthy. Kamal, disillusioned with the system, becomes a shrewd political analyst and campaigner and makes moneylender Ramani the Mayor of Chennai by helping in her campaigns. He later gets the contact of Perumal, who is the leader of the opposition political party. Meanwhile, he joins Perumal's party and makes him win the election, making him the CM of Tamil Nadu. Boopathi is finally arrested for being the reason behind for Sathyamoorthy's suicide with his family. Kamal, at last, saves his property with his intelligence and unites with Sridevi.

Cast

Production
The film was first revealed in early April 2011, when it was reported that Karthi was considering a "social satire" script written by debutant film maker, Shankar Dayal, to be his next venture after the success of his previous film Siruthai. Karthi confirmed the news and revealed he would feature in a new get-up for the film, although expressing that the script was still in development. Veteran actress Raadhika signed on to play a supporting role in May 2011, whilst Roja signed on to play a doctor in the film and Mumtaj was selected to play a role making her comeback after 3 years. Kannada actress Pranitha who made her debut in Tamil with Udhayan, was confirmed for the lead female role after much speculation that Shriya Saran would form a part of the cast.

Kota Srinivasa Rao and Salim Ghouse were selected to play politicians in the film, while Nassar was roped in to play a godman. However, in a turn of events, it was announced that the makers were unimpressed with Ghouse's performance and replaced him with Prakash Raj. Subsequently, combination scenes shot with Ghouse and Mumtaj, including those which appeared in the original trailer, were removed and reshot with Prakash Raj and Kiran Rathod. Anushka Shetty shot for a cameo role, that of a funny police officer within one day, while Andrea Jeremiah also appeared in a single scene.

The first look of the film was duly released through a series of promotional posters in early 2011, with the makers suggesting a potential release to coincide with Diwali 2011. Some scenes were shot in and around Chennai including the Napier bridge, while the climax was shot in Hyderabad. The songs were choreographed by Bobby Antony, Baba Baskar, Prem Rakshith and Raju; one of which was shot in Poland. There were rumours that the film was based on Neera Radia but makers quickly denied it. The team shot a scene at the famous shopping complex near Ashok Nagar in Chennai. The director and his crew were happy to complete the shoot before the place got uncontrollably crowded.

Release
The satellite rights of the film were secured by Sun TV. The film was given a U certificate by the Indian Censor Board without any cuts. It was slated to release in April initially, but failed to meet the deadline and would be released on 22 June eventually. Makers have planned to release the films in more than 1,100 screens across the globe. Andhra will see the film being released in 450 screens. The producers have spent more than  120 million for the promotion of the film. The film Shakuni opened in 85 screens in Kerala by Beebah Creations & Sayujyam Cine Release.

Reception
Saguni received mixed to positive reviews upon release. Behindwoods quoted that Saguni was a fairly engaging political game giving main credits to Karthi and Santhanam. The Tamil version was hit and the Telugu version titled Shakuni succeeded at the box office.

Soundtrack

The soundtrack, composed by G. V. Prakash Kumar, consists of five tracks. The track "Manasellam Mazhaiye" was reused from the hit song "Chalisuva Cheluve" also sung by Sonu Nigam and Saindhavi, from the Kannada film Ullasa Utsaha while "Vella Bambaram" was based on the song "Priyathama" from the Telugu film Ullasamga Utsahamga, both of which featured music composed by Prakash Kumar. The audio launch was to be held on 11 May, but postponed to 2 June. The Telugu version released on 5 June. Two songs along with the videos were launched on 25 May, Karthi's birthday. The song "Kandha Kaaravadai" has been downloaded 75,000 times. Other songs like "Manasellam Mazhaiye" and "Vella Bambaram" also topped the charts . Eventually the album became successful among masses.

Review

Rediff wrote that it was "run-of-the-mill and has nothing new to offer". Behindwoods wrote: "The songs have all been composed with the sole intention of entertaining the audience. Save the melody, the rest all play to the gallery all the way. Good 'mass' album".

References

External links 
 

2010s political comedy films
2010s Tamil-language films
2012 directorial debut films
Films scored by G. V. Prakash Kumar
Films shot in Andhra Pradesh
Indian political comedy films